Peroxisomal biogenesis factor 2 is a protein that in humans is encoded by the PEX2 gene.

This gene encodes an integral peroxisomal membrane protein required for peroxisome biogenesis. The protein is thought to be involved in peroxisomal matrix protein import. Mutations in this gene result in one form of Zellweger syndrome and infantile Refsum disease. Alternative splicing results in multiple transcript variants encoding the same protein.

References

Further reading

External links
  GeneReviews/NCBI/NIH/UW entry on Peroxisome Biogenesis Disorders, Zellweger Syndrome Spectrum
 OMIM entries on Peroxisome Biogenesis Disorders, Zellweger Syndrome Spectrum